Santa Margarita, Spanish for Saint Margaret, may refer to:

Places

United States
Santa Margarita, California, a town in San Luis Obispo County
Santa Margarita de Cortona Asistencia, an 18th-century mission near the town
Santa Margarita Lake
Rancho Santa Margarita, California, a city in Orange County
Santa Margarita Catholic High School, in Rancho Santa Margarita
Santa Margarita Formation, a geologic formation in the San Joaquin Valley, California
Santa Margarita Mountains, San Diego County, California
Santa Margarita River, in the Santa Ana Mountains, California

Other countries
Santa Margarita Island, Magdalena Bay, Baja California Sur, Mexico
Santa Margarita, Samar, Philippines
Santa Margarita (La Línea de la Concepción), a gated community in the Province of Cadiz, Andalucia, Spain
Santa Margarita, Trinidad and Tobago

Other uses
Santa Margarita (shipwreck), a shipwreck near Key West off the coast of Florida, US
Santa Margarita Stakes, an American Thoroughbred horse race at Santa Anita Park in California, US

See also 
Margarita (disambiguation)
Saint Margaret (disambiguation)
Santa Margalida, Mallorca, Spain
Santa Margerita, Mosta, Malta
Santa Margerita Chapel, in San Gwann, Malta
Santa Margherita (disambiguation)